The following is a list of a notable people who have at one time been known for . Short for "costume play", it is an activity in which participants wear costumes and accessories to represent a specific character or idea from a work of fiction.

Notable cosplayers

References

 
Cosplayers